Paradistichodus dimidiatus is a species of distichodontid fish that occurs in the African nations of Burkina Faso, Cameroon, Chad, Gambia, Ghana, Guinea, Guinea-Bissau, Mali, Mauritania, Niger, Nigeria, and Senegal. It is the only described species in its genus.

References
 

Distichodontidae
Monotypic fish genera
Fish of Africa
Taxa named by Jacques Pellegrin